Ben Patrick Johnson (born June 30, 1969 in Tucson, Arizona) is an American voice actor, author and blogger, Foundation Director, and human rights activist.

Voice-overs
Early in his acting career, he participated in voice-over workshops with Joan Gerber.

Johnson appeared on CBS (promoting Survivor, CSI: NY, Numbers and other shows), Fox (for House M.D., Bones, Family Guy, The Cleveland Show and Raising Hope), the cable channels Nickelodeon, Cartoon Network, Starz, NFL Network, Big Ten Network, The 101 Network, N3D and others. His voice has been used to promote movies such as Ice Age, Marmaduke, The Whole Ten Yards, Gulliver's Travels, "Sleepover", Alvin and the Chipmunks, Planet 51, Night at the Museum, Hot Tub Time Machine, Sonic the Hedgehog, Ferdinand, Sherlock Gnomes, The Pianist, Minority Report, Signs, and Apocalypse Now, Adam Sandler movies like Eight Crazy Nights and 50 First Dates and in commercials for Burger King, Kellogg's and Old Navy.

In 1998, after a brief stint at E!, Johnson moved to Extra's rival entertainment magazine Entertainment Tonight, where he was that show's signature voice for the next four seasons. From 1998 to 2005, he was the announcer on the syndicated court show Judge Joe Brown.

Writing

Johnson's newest novel, "If the Rains Don't Cleanse", was published in August 2009 by Havenhurst Books. It is a historical novel detailing the experiences of Johnson's parents while Christian schoolteacher missionaries in Belgian Congo in the 1950s and addressing themes of Christianity, spirituality and European Colonialism.

Previous novels include In and Out In Hollywood, a roman à clef about a celebrity news show anchor whose fortunes change after he comes out, Third and Heaven, and One Size Fits All, which details the excesses of a young fashion designer dressing three Best Actress nominees for the Oscars.

Social media and activism
In 2006, Johnson launched a webcast called Life on the Left Coast. The video blog featured news, celebrity friends and humor segments. Johnson's political commentaries, another staple of the webcast, upset a variety of Christian Right Organizations including The Capital Resource Institute after Johnson condemned the CRI for its position on a bill pending in the California Legislature. CRI issued a statement denouncing Johnson, Equality California, and the webcast. After more than a million views on YouTube, Johnson put the show on hiatus to focus on writing and activism via Facebook and Twitter.
Johnson is on the board of Gay Men's Chorus of Los Angeles.

In September 2010, Johnson wrote and produced two political TV spots  for Equality California, Whitman Shame and Cooley Shame. The ads, directed at CA Republican gubernatorial candidate Meg Whitman and Republican Attorney General candidate Steve Cooley, address the candidates' pledges to defend CA Prop 8 in a potential court challenge. Writing about  EQCA and Johnson's ads, gay activist blogger Rex Wockner suggested that this was the first time a major LGBT organization had gone on the political offensive by playing hardball in TV ads about same-sex marriage.

Philanthropy
The Ben Patrick Johnson Foundation, launched in 2006, benefits LGBT Issues, Human Rights, Education and Interfaith Dialogue. Shortly after its inception, the BPJ Foundation partnered with the organization Live and Give to fund housing for an elementary school in Thailand's Chiang Mai province. The Foundation also passes funding to Habitat for Humanity, the micro-loan organization Kiva, Gay and Lesbian Elder Housing, and The National Gay and Lesbian Task Force for its interfaith initiative, The Institute for Welcoming Resources.

Extra controversy
Johnson's first national exposure came in 1994 when he was chosen as co-host for Extra, an entertainment magazine show. Extra demoted Johnson to Senior Correspondent shortly after he came out as gay in the LGBT press and on KABC Talkradio, where he had been Director of Production prior to Extra. Warner Bros. Television, the producers of Extra, declined to comment on the demotion.

See also

 List of male underwear models

References

External links
 
 Ben Patrick Johnson in Paragon Men, January 2011

1969 births
Living people
American gay writers
American male voice actors
Male models from Arizona
Gay models
LGBT people from Arizona
American gay actors
American LGBT rights activists
Video bloggers
American podcasters
Male bloggers
21st-century LGBT people